Emma Adbåge (born 1982) is a Swedish illustrator and children's writer. In addition to illustrating her own books, she contributes to works by other authors while also taking on commissions from educational publishers. In 2013, she was awarded the Elsa Beskow prize for her illustrated Lenis Olle and other works for children.

Biography
Born in 1982 in Linköping, Adbåge is the twin sister of Lisen Adbåge, who is also an illustrator, cartoonist and writer. After completing high school in Mjölby, they both studied illustration at the Cartoonist School in Hofors. By the time they were 21, they had each illustrated several books by various authors.

In 2011, for her book  (Leni is a Honeybun), Adbåge won the Silver Award for Illustration in the "Kolla!" competition arranged by the Association of Swedish Illustrators and Graphic Designers. It is the story of a little girl who initially thinks it would be interesting to act like an adult, but when she discovers all the work grown-ups have to do, she decides instead to become a baby.

Her Outdoor math: fun activities for every season (2016) has been published in English. It encourages five to eight-year-olds to learn maths by playing with objects they can find outside, such as measuring the length of a worm or building a snowman.

Adbåge's 2018 book Gropen received the August Prize in the children and young adult category.

References

External links
Emma Adbåge's website

1982 births
Living people
20th-century Swedish women artists
20th-century Swedish women writers
People from Östergötland
Swedish illustrators
Swedish women illustrators
Swedish children's book illustrators
Swedish children's writers
Swedish women children's writers